Bloodbrothers is a 2005 Swedish crime film directed by Daniel Fridell starring Liam Norberg, Thorsten Flinck, Sofia Helin, Thomas Hedengran and Noomi Rapace. The film released on 2 December 2005 in Sweden.

Plot
30-year-old Jon is released after seven years in prison and decides to put all his criminal activities behind him and start a new life.

Cast

Production 
Blodsbröder was filmed on a very small budget of 500,000 SEK and took three years to make. The movie is an independent sequel to Fridell's earlier movie Sökarna, released more than ten years later.

Reception 
Fredrik Strage called Blodsbröder a "total collapse" ("totalkollaps") in a review in Dagens Nyheter. Esbjörn Guwallius, writing for Swedish film site film.nu, described it as a "positive surprise", while noting that many would probably call it a fiasco. Writing for Svenska Dagbladet, Jeanette Gentele called it "exciting, well exectued and a little bit amusing" ("spännande och välgjord och även litet rolig") while Jan-Olov Andersson called it "better than expected" in Aftonbladet.

References

External links

2005 drama films
2005 films
Films directed by Daniel Fridell
Swedish drama films
2000s Swedish-language films
2000s Swedish films